Khatanga is a rural locality (a selo) in Taymyrsky Dolgano-Nenetsky District of Krasnoyarsk Krai, Russia, located on the Khatanga River on the Taymyr Peninsula. It is one of the northernmost inhabited localities in Russia. As of the 2002 Census, its population was 3,450.

The name Khatanga means "large water" in the local Evenki language. The locality is known to have existed since the 17th century. It is served by the Khatanga Airport.

Khatanga is relatively close to the Popigai impact structure, an asteroid impact structure and geological formation located in northern Siberia. The crater has been noted since September 2012 as a potential source of a significant new global supply of industrial diamonds.

Economy

Tourism 
Khatanga is sometimes visited by Western sightseers touring the surrounding natural wilderness in Siberia. It has a hotel, a natural history museum, and weather reporting stations.

In 2019, mayor Yevgeny Vershinin announced plans to develop the locality to act as a hub for travelers on their way to the North Pole, hoping to compete with Longyearbyen, a Norwegian town on the island of Svalbard, for Arctic tourists. The locality has been used as a pit stop for northern expeditions in the past, with helicopters coming from Krasnoyarsk occasionally stopping there on their way to the North Pole.

The Khatanga airport is one of the largest and most operable in the Russian Arctic, with the main runway receiving renovations in 2009. However, the rest of the airport, especially the terminal, is in extremely poor condition.

Port 
The locality is home to the ZAO Sea Commercial Port of Khatanga which accepts various Arctic cargo shipments. Two of the berths service the port fleet, two receive general cargo, and one is reserved for oil products. Goods such as refrigerated cargo, timber, and bulk shipments of coal, sand, gravel, and oil are processed at the port.

Climate
Khatanga has a subarctic climate (Köppen climate classification Dfc) with short, mild summers and bitterly cold winters. Precipitation is quite low, but is somewhat heavier in summer, when it falls mostly as rain, than in the rest of the year, when it falls mostly as snow.

References

Rural localities in Krasnoyarsk Krai
Taymyrsky Dolgano-Nenetsky District
Yeniseysk Governorate
Populated places of Arctic Russia
North Siberian Lowland